Penstemon penlandii is a rare species of flowering plant in the plantain family known by the common names Penland penstemon and Penland's beardtongue. It is endemic to Colorado in the United States, where it is known only from a strip of land about five miles long in central Grand County. There are two occurrences totalling about 8600 individuals. This is a federally listed endangered species of the United States.

This plant was discovered in the 1980s during surveys for Osterhout's milkvetch (Astragalus osterhoutii), another rare local endemic. The two plants are found only in Middle Park, a valley with seleniferous badlands that host a unique flora. The penstemon grows in clay that is rich in selenium, an element toxic to most other plants in high concentrations. In adjacent stretches of land that have a lower selenium content the penstemon population becomes thinner and it is replaced by sagebrush. The penstemon grows in the shade of the banks of runoff channels that are periodically flooded; the plant's deep, ropelike roots and rhizome anchor it to underground shale deposits to prevent it from being torn away during floods.

This perennial herb arises from a woody caudex attached to the thick root system. The flowering stems are up to 25 centimeters tall with small, linear leaves. The inflorescence contains up to 15 purple-blue flowers each measuring roughly 1.5 centimeters long. They are tubular opening into wide mouths containing staminodes tipped with orange hairs. The plants are partly self-compatible, but for more efficient fruit production the flowers must be visited by pollinators. Many species of bees, especially of genus Osmia, pollinate the flowers, as does the beardtongue-specialist pollen wasp Pseudomasaris vespoides. Blooming occurs in June and July.

The plant occurs in a section of land in northern Middle Park measuring about 5 miles or 2.4 kilometers long and under a kilometer wide. It was added to the US Endangered Species List the same day as its fellow local endemic Osterhout's milkvetch. They are both naturally rare and are threatened by off-road vehicle use in their barren, dry habitat. The penstemon is threatened by the maintenance of a nearby road. Mineral exploration may also be a threat in the area.

References

penlandii
Flora of Colorado
Grand County, Colorado
Plants described in 1986